Šljivno is a village in the municipality of Banja Luka, Republika Srpska, Bosnia and Herzegovina. The village is currently uninhabited.

Geography 
The village is located 25 km southwest of Banja Luka.

Population 
The village was abandoned after the start of the construction of a military training ground on Mount Manyacha.

History 
The first mention of the village dates back to 1541. The village developed slowly, with a population of just over a thousand people by the early 1960s. Over time, the construction of a military training ground on Mount Manyacha began, and all residents were forced to leave the village forever.

Notable Natives 

 Vitomir Miletic; Serbian artist born here in 1967.

References

Links 

 Official website of the town and municipality of Banja Luka 

Villages in Republika Srpska
Populated places in Banja Luka